Simon of Joinville was a French knight, who became the Lord of Joinville from 1204 until his death in 1233. He was also the hereditary seneschal of the County of Champagne.

Biography

Simon was the fourth son of Geoffrey IV of Joinville and Helvide of Dampierre, a daughter of Guy I of Dampierre.

Simon succeeded his eldest brother Geoffrey V as lord of Joinville, who died without children at Krak des Chevaliers in late 1203 or early 1204 during the Fourth Crusade.

In 1209, he participated in the initial campaign of the Albigensian Crusade, and after the fall of Carcassonne he came back to Joinville.

In the war of the Succession of Champagne, he fought for his cousin Erard of Brienne-Ramerupt and his wife Philippa of Champagne against the countess-regent Blanche of Navarre and her son Theobald, because the hereditary office of seneschal was not appointed by Blanche. Blanche's forces ravaged the lands of Joinville, and she imposed a humiliating surrender agreement: Simon's fortresses were seized, his eldest son Geoffroy was taken hostage, and he was forced to transfer his ancestral castle at Joinville to his brother, Bishop William, as security for his good conduct.

Then, in 1218, he participated in the Fifth Crusade with his cousin, the king of Jerusalem, John of Brienne. He fought in the Siege of Damietta and was back in Champagne in September 1220.

Simon of Joinville died on May 1233 and was buried in Clairvaux Abbey.

Family

In the year 1207 Simon married Ermengarde of Montclair, daughter of John of Montclair, and had:
 Geoffrey of Joinville, d. 1232, lord of Montclair; married Marie of Garlande
 Isabelle of Joinville, lady of Montclair after her brother; married Simon IV of Clermont.
 Béatrix of Joinville; married Guermond of Châlons.

Ermengarde of Montclair died in 1218, and in a second marriage Simon married Beatrix (or Beatrice) of Auxonne, daughter of Count Stephen III of Auxonne, and had:
 John (Jean) of Joinville, lord of Joinville; married Alix of Grandpré
 Geoffrey of Joinville, first baron of Geneville; married Maud de Lacy.
 Simon of Joinville, lord of Marnay and Gex; married Leonete of Geneva.
 William (Guillaume) of Joinville, Archdeacon of Salins, rector of Arthinurchir (Ireland) and archdeacon of Besançon.
 Marie; married Guighes, Dauphin de Viennois.
 Simonette of Joinville; married Jean of Tilchâtel.
 Héloïse of Joinville; married Jean of Faucogney. She founded the monastery of Montigny. (This child is not included in source document.)

Notes

References

Sources

1170s births
1233 deaths
Christians of the Fifth Crusade
People of the Albigensian Crusade
Medieval French nobility
12th-century French people
13th-century French people
People from Haute-Marne